Haridwar (Old name Mayapuri) is a city and municipal corporation in the Haridwar district of Uttarakhand, India. With a population of 228,832 in 2011, it is the second-largest city in the state and the largest in the district.

The city is situated on the right bank of the Ganges river, at the foothills of the Shivalik ranges. Haridwar is regarded as a holy place for Hindus, hosting important religious events and serving as a gateway to several prominent places of worship. Most significant of the events is the Kumbha Mela, which is celebrated every 12 years in Haridwar. During the Haridwar Kumbh Mela, millions of pilgrims, devotees, and tourists congregate in Haridwar to perform ritualistic bathing on the banks of the Ganges to wash away their sins to attain moksha.

According to Puranic legend, Haridwar, along with Ujjain, Nashik, and Prayag, is one of four sites where drops of amrita, the elixir of immortality, accidentally spilled over from a kumbha (pitcher) while being carried by the celestial bird Garuda during the Samudra Manthana, or the churning of the ocean of milk. Brahma Kund, the spot where the amrita fell, is believed to be located at Har ki Pauri (literally, "footsteps of the Lord") and is considered to be the most sacred ghat of Haridwar. It is also the primary centre of the Kanwar pilgrimage, in which millions of participants gather sacred water from the Ganges and carry it across hundreds of miles to dispense as offerings in Shiva shrines. Today, the city is developing beyond its religious importance with the fast-developing industrial estate of the State Industrial Development Corporation of Uttarakhand (SIDCUL), and the close by township of Bharat Heavy Electricals Limited (BHEL), as well as its affiliated ancillaries.

Haridwar presents a kaleidoscope of Indian culture and development. In sacred writings, it has been differently specified as Kapilsthan, Gangadwar and Mayapuri. It is additionally a passage for the Chota Char Dham (the four principal pilgrim destinations in Uttarakhand). Subsequently, Shaivites (devotees of Shiva) and Vaishavites (devotees of Vishnu) call the city Hardwar and Haridwar, respectively, Har meaning Shiva and Hari, Vishnu.

Etymology

The modern name of the town has two spellings: Haridwar and Hardwar. Each of these names has its own connotation.

In Sanskrit, the liturgical language of Hinduism, Hari means "Vishnu", while dwar means "gateway". So, Haridwar translates to "The Gateway to  Vishnu". It earns this name because it is typically the place where pilgrim's start their journey to visit a prominent temple of  Vishnu – Badrinath.

Similarly, Hara could also mean "Shiva". Hence, Hardwar could stand for "Gateway to  Shiva". Hardwar is also a typical place to start a pilgrim's journey in order to reach Mount Kailash, Kedarnath, the northernmost Jyotirlinga and one of the sites of the smaller Char Dham pilgrimage circuit – all important places for worship for Hindus.

According to legend, it was in Haridwar that Goddess Ganga descended when Shiva released the mighty river from the locks of his hair.

In the annotations to her poetical illustration Hurdwar, a Place of Hindoo Pilgrimage, Letitia Elizabeth Landon provides information on this name derivation, and also the story of the supposed origin of the 'River Ganges'. The accompanying plate is engraved from a painting by Samuel Prout

History

In the scriptures, Haridwar has been variously mentioned as Kapilasthana, Gangadwara and Mayapuri. It is also an entry point to the Char Dham (the four main centres of pilgrimage in Uttarakhand viz, Badrinath, Kedarnath, Gangotri, and Yamunotri), hence, Shaivaites (followers of  Shiva) and Vaishnavites (followers of  Vishnu) call this place Hardwar and Haridwar respectively, corresponding to Hara being Shiv and Hari being Vishnu.

In the Vanaparva of the Mahabharat, where sage Dhaumya tells Yudhishthira about the tirthas of India, Gangadwar, i.e., Haridwar and Kankhal, have been referred to, the text also mentions that Agastya Rishi did penance here, with the help of his wife, Lopamudra (the princess of Vidharba).

Sage Kapila is said to have an ashram here giving it, its ancient name, Kapila or Kapilasthana.

The legendary King, Bhagiratha, the great-grandson of the Suryavanshi King Sagar (an ancestor of Rama), is said to have brought the river Ganges down from heaven, through years of penance in Satya Yuga, for the salvation of 60,000 of his ancestors from the curse of the saint Kapila, a tradition continued by thousands of devout Hindus, who bring the ashes of their departed family members, in hope of their salvation.  Vishnu is said to have left his footprint on the stone that is set in the upper wall of Har Ki Pauri, where the Holy Ganges touches it at all times.

Haridwar came under the rule of the Maurya Empire (322–185 BCE), and later under the Kushan Empire (c. 1st–3rd centuries). Archaeological findings have proved that terra cotta culture dating between 1700 BCE and 1200 BCE existed in this region. First modern era written evidence of Haridwar is found in the accounts of a Chinese traveller, Huan Tsang, who visited India in 629 CE. during the reign of King Harshavardhan (590–647) records Haridwar as 'Mo-yu-lo', the remains of which still exist at Mayapur, a little to the south of the modern town. Among the ruins are a fort and three temples, decorated with broken stone sculptures, he also mentions the presence of a temple, north of Mo-yu-lo called 'Gangadwara', Gateway of the Ganges.

Haridwar came under the rule of the Delhi Sultanate in 1206.

The city also fell to the Central Asian conqueror Timur Lang (1336–1405) on 13 January 1399.

During his visit to Haridwar, first Sikh Guru, Guru Nanak (1469–1539) bathed at 'Kushawart Ghat', wherein the famous, 'watering the crops' episode took place, his visit is today commemorated by a gurudwara (Gurudwara Nanakwara), according to two Sikh Janamsakhis, this visit took place on the Baisakhi day in 1504 CE, he later also visited Kankhal en route to Kotdwara in Garhwal. Pandas of the Haridwar have been known to keep genealogy records of most of the Hindu population. Known as Vahis, these records are updated on each visit to the city, and are a repository of vast family trees of the family in North India.

In the 16th century, the city came under the rule of the Mughals. Ain-e-Akbari, written by Abul Fazal in the 16th century during the reign of Mughal Emperor Akbar, refers to it as Maya (Mayapur), known as Hardwar on the Ganges", as seven sacred cities of Hindus. It further mentions it is eighteen kos (each approx. 2 km) in length, and large numbers of pilgrims assemble on the 10th of Chaitra. It also mentions that during his travels and also while at home, Mughal Emperor, Akbar drank water from the Ganges river, which he called 'the water of immortality'. Special people were stationed at Sorun and later Haridwar to dispatch water, in sealed jars, to wherever he was stationed

During the Mughal period, there was mint for Akbar's copper coinage at Haridwar. It is said that Raja Man Singh of Amber, laid that foundation of the present-day city of Haridwar and also renovated the ghats at Har Ki Pauri. After his death, his ashes are also said to have been immersed at Brahma Kund. Thomas Coryat, an English traveller, who visited the city in the reign of Emperor Jahangir (1596–1627) mentions it as 'Haridwara', the capital of Shiva.

Being one of the oldest living cities, Haridwar finds its mention in the ancient Hindu scriptures as it weaves through the life and time stretching from the period of the Buddha, to the more recent British advent. Haridwar has a rich and ancient religious and cultural heritage. It still has many old havelis and mansions bearing exquisite murals and intricate stonework.

One of the two major dams on the river Ganges, the Bhimgoda, is situated here. Built-in the 1840s, it diverts the waters of the Ganges to the Upper Ganges Canal, which irrigated the surrounding lands. Though this caused severe deterioration to the Ganges water flow, and is a major cause for the decay of the Ganges as an inland waterway, which till the 18th century was used heavily by the ships of the East India Company, and a town as high up as Tehri, was considered a port city The headworks of the Ganges Canal system is located in Haridwar. The Upper Ganges Canal was opened in 1854 after the work began in April 1842, prompted by the famine of 1837–38.

'Haridwar Union Municipality' was constituted in 1868, which included the then villages of Mayapur and Kankhal. Haridwar was first connected with railways, via Laksar, through branch line in 1886, when the Awadh and Rohilakhand Railway line was extended through Roorkee to Saharanpur, this was later extended to Dehradun in 1900.

In 1901, it had a population of 25,597 and was a part of the Roorkee tehsil, in Saharanpur district of the United Province, and remained so till the creation of Uttar Pradesh in 1947.

Haridwar has been an abode of the weary in body, mind, and spirit. It has also been a centre of attraction for learning various arts, science, and culture. The city has a long-standing position as a great source of Ayurvedic medicines and herbal remedies and is home to the unique Gurukul (school of traditional education), including the Gurukul Kangri Vishwavidyalaya, which has a vast campus, and has been providing traditional education of its own kind, since 1902. Development of Haridwar took an upturn in the 1960s, with the setting up of a temple of modern civilisation, BHEL, a 'Maharatna PSU' in 1975, which brought along not just a its own township of BHEL, Ranipur, close to the existing Ranipur village, but also a set of ancillaries in the region. The University of Roorkee, now IIT Roorkee, is one of the oldest and most prestigious institutes of learning in the fields of science and engineering.

Geography and climate

The Ganges emerges from the mountains to touch the plains. The water in the river Ganges is mostly clear and generally cold, except in the rainy season, during which soil from the upper regions flows down into it.

The river Ganges flows in a series of channels separated from each other called aits, most of which are well wooded. Other minor seasonal streams are Ranipur Rao, Pathri Rao, Ravi Rao, Harnaui Rao, Begham Nadi etc. A large part of the district is forested, and Rajaji National Park is within the bounds of the district, making it an ideal destination for wildlife and adventure lovers.

Climate

Temperatures:
 Summers: 
 Winters:

Cityscape

Hindu genealogy registers at Haridwar

For centuries when Hindu ancestors visited the holy town of Haridwar for any purpose which may have been for pilgrimage purposes or/and for cremation of their dead or for immersion of ashes and bones of their kin after cremation into the waters of the holy Ganges as required by Hindu religious custom, it has been a custom to go to the Pandit who is in charge of one's family register and update the family's family tree with details of marriages, births, and deaths from ones extended joint family.

Demographics

 India census, Haridwar district has population of 1,890,422 (2011). In 2001, the population was 1,447,187.

Haridwar city has a 310,562 population (2011). Males constitute 54% of the population and females, 46%. Haridwar has an average literacy rate of 70%, higher than the national average of 59.5%: male literacy is 75%, and female literacy is 64%. In Haridwar, 12% of the population is under six years of age.

Religious sites

In Hindu traditions, the 'Panch Tirth' (Five Pilgrimages) within Haridwar, are "Gangadwar" (Har ki Pauri), Kushawart (Ghat in Kankhal), Bilwa Tirtha (Mansa Devi Temple) and Neel Parvat (Chandi Devi Temple). There are several other temples and ashrams located in and around the city, a list of which can be found below. Also, alcohol and non-vegetarian food is not permitted in Haridwar.

Har Ki Pauri

This Ghat was constructed by King Vikramaditya (1st century BCE) in memory of his brother Bharthari. It is believed that Bharthari came to Haridwar and meditated on the banks of the holy Ganges. When he died, his brother constructed a Ghat in his name, which later came to be known as Har Ki Pauri. The most sacred ghat within Har Ki Pauri is Brahmakund. The evening prayer (Aarti) at dusk offered to Goddess Ganga at Har Ki Pauri (steps of God Hara or Shiva) is an enchanting experience for any visitor. A spectacle of sound and colour is seen when, after the ceremony, pilgrims float Diyas (floral floats with lamps) and incense on the river, commemorating their deceased ancestors. Thousands of people from all around the world do make a point to attend this prayer on their visit to Haridwar. A majority of present ghats were largely developed in the 1800s.
On the night of Dussehra or a few days before that, the Ganga Canal is dried in Haridwar to clean the riverbed. The water is restored on Diwali. It is believed that on Dussera Maa Ganga goes to her father's house and returns after Bhai Duj or Bhai Phota. It is for this reason that the waters in the Ganga canal in Haridwar are partially dried on the night of Dussehra and the waters are restored on the day of Bhai Duj or Bhai Phota.

Chandi Devi Temple

The temple is dedicated to Goddess Chandi, who sits atop the 'Neel Parvat' on the eastern bank of the river Ganges. It was constructed in 1929 CE by the king of Kashmir, Suchat Singh. Skanda Purana mentions a legend, in which Chanda-Munda, the Army Chief of a local Demon Kings Shumbha and Nishumbha were killed by goddess Chandi here, after which the place got the name, Chandi Devi. It is believed that the main statue was established by the Adi Shankaracharya in the 8th century CE. The temple is a  trek from Chandighat and can also be reached through a ropeway.

Mansa Devi Temple

 

The temple of Goddess Mansa Devi is situated at the top of the Bilva Parvat, literally means 'Goddess fulfilling desires'. Mansa is a tourist destination, Especially because of the mountain cable cars which offer city views. The main temple houses two idols of the Goddess, one with three mouths and five arms, while the other one has eight arms.

Maya Devi Temple

Haridwar was previously known as Mayapuri which is because of the Goddess Maya Devi. Dating to the 11th century CE, this ancient temple of Maya Devi, the Adhishthatri Devi (Patron Goddess) of Haridwar, is considered one of the Siddhapithas and is said to be the place where the heart and navel of Goddess Sati had fallen. It is one of few ancient temples still standing in Haridwar, along with Narayani Shila temple and Bhairav Temple.

Makarvahini Temple 
Located close to the Birla Ghat, near Laltarao Pul is a temple dedicated to Goddess Ganga. This temple was established by Jayandra Saraswati, Shankaracharya of Kanchi Kamakoti, a few decades ago. The temple, built in South-Indian style, has a traditional custom of decorating the goddess with vegetables and dry fruits, giving her the title of Shakumbhari on Ashtami Pooja, the eighth day of Navratri.

Kankhal

The ancient temple of Daksha Mahadev also known as Daksheshwar Mahadev Temple has situated in the south Kankhal town. According to Hindu texts, King Daksha Prajapati, father of Dakshayani,  Shiva's first wife, performed a yagña, to which he deliberately did not invite  Shiva. When she arrived uninvited, he was further insulted by the king, seeing which Sati felt infuriated and self-immolated herself in the yagna kund. King Daksha was later killed by Virabhadra, born out of Shiva's anger. Later the king was brought to life and given a goat's head by Shiva. Daksha Mahadev temple is a tribute to this legend.

Sati Kund, another historical heritage is situated in the Kankhal. Legend has it that Sati immolated herself in this kund.

Bharat Mata Mandir

Bharat Mata Mandir is a multi-storey temple dedicated to Bharat Mata (Mother India). Bharat Mata Mandir was inaugurated on 15 May 1983 by Indira Gandhi on the banks of the river Ganges. Each floor depicts an era in the Indian history, from the days of Ramayana until India's independence.

On the first floor is the statue of Bharat Mata. The second floor, Shur Mandir, is dedicated to the well-renowned heroes of India. The third floor Matri Mandir is dedicated to the achievements of India's revered women, such as Radha, Mira, Savitri, Draupadi, Ahilya, Anusuya, Maitreyi, Gargi etc. The great saints from various religions, including Jainism, Sikhism, and Buddhism are featured on the fourth floor Sant Mandir. The assembly hall with walls depicting symbolic coexistence of all religions practised in India and paintings portraying history in various provinces is situated on the fifth floor. The various forms of the Goddess Shakti can be seen on the sixth floor, whilst the seventh floor is devoted to all incarnations of  Vishnu. The eighth floor holds the shrine of  Shiva from which devotees can gain a view of Himalayas, Haridwar, and the campus of Sapta Sarovar.

The temple was built under the former Shankaracharya Maha-Mandleshwar Swami Satyamitranand Giri Maharaj.  Since the inception of the Swami Satyamitranand foundation in 1998, several other branches have been opened, namely in Renukut, Jabalpur, Jodhpur, Indore, and Ahmedabad. It is presently under The Junapeethadheesh, Acharya Shree Mahamandaleshwar Swami Avdheshanand Giri Ji Maharaj.

Piran Kaliyar
Piran Kaliyar Sharif, built by Ibrahim Lodhi, a ruler of Delhi, this 'Dargah' of Hazrat Alauddin Sabir Kaliyari, a 13th-century, Sufi Saint of Chishti Order (also known as Sarkar Sabir Pak), in Kaliyar village, . from Roorkee, is visited by devotees from all over the world, during the annual 'Urs' festival, which is celebrated from 1st day of sighting the moon to 16th day of Rabi al-awwal month, in the Islamic calendar.

Neel Dhara Pakshi Vihar
The Bhimgoda Barrage is on the Ganges River near Har-Ki-Pauri Ghat. The barrage was originally built to aid irrigation but it also generates hydro-electric power and controls floods. The area behind the barrage is known as Neel Dhara Pakshi Vihar. The place is popular among bird-loving tourists. The place is known for Siberian Cranes that can be spotted during the winter months at Laljiwala. In addition, the place is also a natural habitat of different species of migratory birds. Not only avid bird watchers, but the spot also welcomes a number of nature lovers and trekkers. Also, the spot of Neel Dhara Pakshi Vihar is visited by trekkers as it is situated close to many trekking routes in Haridwar. Visitors can also see the Shivalik Hills from the bird watching point and enjoy the sight of the snow-covered mountains which makes it to the top list of tourist attractions in Haridwar.

Other temples and ashrams
Dudhadhari Barfani Temple, part of the ashram of Dudhadhari Barfani Baba, was constructed from shining white marble and honours Rama-Sita and Hanumana.Sureshvari Devi Temple, a temple dedicated to the goddess Sureshwari, is situated in the middle of Rajaji National Park, and thus is only accessible with permission from forest rangers. Pawan Dham is a modern temple made entirely of glass pieces, which is now a tourist destination.

One of the most sacred temples in Haridwar is Tirupati Balaji Mandir. It is a major pilgrimage centre of Haridwar in Uttarakhand. The image of the temple deity represents both  Vishnu and  Shiva ( Vishnu is considered as the preserver whereas  Shiva is considered as the destroyer in Hindu religion).

Sapt Rishi Ashram at Sapt Sarovar, near the bank of the Ganga, is a meditation and yoga centre. The Ashram, established in 1943 by Guru Goswami Dutt, provides lodging, meals and free education for poor kids. Sapt Rishi Ashram, as its name would suggest, was the place where seven sages, namely Kashyapa, Vashisht, Atri, Vishwamitra, Jamadagi, Bharadwaja and Gautam, meditated. As per the mythological records, when all the sages were meditating, they were disturbed by the gushing sound of river Ganges. Annoyed and irritated due to sound, all seven of them were trapped in the flow of the river. Later, Ganges River splits into seven water streams so there is less noise. Those seven river streams are now known as Sapt Sarovar, and the point where the seven sages meditated is called as Saptrishi Ashram.

In the Harihar Ashram, Kankhal, the Parad Shivalinga (Mercury Shivalinga) weighing about 150  kg and a Rudraksha tree are the main attractions for pilgrims and tourists. The Ramanand Ashram, situated in the Shravan Nath Nagar district near the railway station, is the main ashram of Ramanand Sampraday in Haridwar. The Uma Maheswar Sanyas Ashram lies on the banks of the Ganga, in Bairagi Camp; while the Anandamayi Maa Ashram is located in Kankhal, one of five sub-cities of Haridwar, and houses the samadhi shrine of Sri Anandamoyi Ma (1896–1982), a noted saint of India. Shantikunj is the headquarters of the spiritual and social organisation All World Gayatri Pariwar (AWGP) established by Pandit Shriram Sharma Acharya. Located  from Haridwar railway station, at the bank of the Ganges and under the Shivalik Himalayas, it is a place of attraction for tourists as well as seekers of spiritual guidance.

The Shri Chintamani Parshwnath Jain Shwetambar Mandir was built in 1990 by Jain saint Shri Padam Sagar Suri. This temple is built by Jaisalmer stone in Jain architectural style. Moolnayak of this temple is a black coloured idol of Chintamani Parshwnath Bhagwan in Padmasan posture. Idols of Shri Parshv Yaksha and Mata Padmawati on both sides of the main idol. There is also an idol of Rishabhanatha made up of white marble. There is small temple of Shri Ghantakaran Mahavir Ji and charan-paduka's (foot imprints) near this temple. The temple also has a dharmshala for accommodation of around 1000 pilgrims at a time.

The Patanjali Yogpeeth is situated in Haridwar-Delhi Highway. This is a yoga institution and research centre of Swami Ramdev. Every day thousands of people come here for yoga and other purposes. The Ramakrishna Math and Ramakrishna Mission Sevashrama is a branch of the worldwide Ramakrishna Movement. The Mission centre was founded in 1901, and the Math centre was started in 1980. The Math centre conducts daily worship and bhajans, and fortnightly Ramnam Sankirtan.

Seven holy places (Sapta Puri) 

"Ayodhyā Mathurā Māyā Kāśī Kāñcī Avantikā 
Purī Dvārāvatī caiva saptaitā mokṣadāyikāḥ" – Garuḍa Purāṇa I XVI .14

Ayodhya, Mathura, Haridwar, Kasi, Kanchi, Avantika and Dwaraka are the seven holy places.

Note the use of the puranic name 'Maya' for Haridwar. As also the inter-change usage of Puri and Dwaraka.

The Garuḍa Purāṇa enumerates seven cities as the giver of Moksha. Haridwar is said to be one of the seven most holy Hindu places (=Kṣetra) in India, with Varanasi usually considered the holiest. A Kṣetra is sacred ground, a field of active power, a place where Moksha, final release can be obtained.

Educational institutions

Unipolaris Academy 
An Edtech startup in Haridwar providing live online classes through visualization techniques.

Acharyakulam
situated in Haridwar- Delhi highway it is the part of Patanjali group.  This is residential institution.

Gurukul Kangri University
Situated in Kankhal, at the banks of the river Ganges, Gurukul Kangri University is one of the oldest Universities of India, it was founded in 1902 by Swami Shraddhananda (1856–1926), according to the tenets of Swami Dayananda Saraswati, the founder of Arya Samaj. It has also been visited by British Trade Union leader Charles Freer Andrews and British prime minister, Ramsay MacDonald, to study the unique Gurukul based education system. Here Ancient Vedic and Sanskrit literature, Ayurveda, Philosophy are part of the curriculum besides Modern Sciences and Journalism. Its 'Archaeological Museum', (established 1945) houses some rare statues, coins, paintings, manuscripts, and artefacts, starting from Indus Valley civilisation culture (c. 2500–1500 BCE). Mahatma Gandhi visited the campus three times, and stayed in its sprawling and serene campus for extended periods of time, most notably during the 1915 Kumbh mela, followed by a visit in 1916, when on 20 March, he spoke at Gurukul Anniversary.

Dev Sanskriti Vishwavidyalaya
Dev Sanskriti Vishwavidyalaya was established in 2002 by the act of the Uttarakhand Government is a fully residential university. Run by Shri Vedmata Gayatri Trust, Shantikunj, Haridwar (headquarters of All World Gayatri Pariwar), it provides various degree, diploma and certificate courses in areas like Yogic Science, Alternative Therapy, Indian Culture, Tourism, Rural Management, Theology, Spiritual Counseling, etc. It also provides courses through distance learning.

Uttarakhand Sanskrit University
Set up by the Government of Uttarakhand, the university is dedicated to studies of ancient Sanskrit scriptures and books. It also has a curriculum covering ancient Hindu rituals, culture, and tradition, and boasts of a building inspired by ancient Hindu architecture style.

Chinmaya Degree College
Situated in Shivalik Nagar,  from Haridwar city. one of the science colleges in Haridwar.

HEC PG College
It was established in the year 2002. HEC College provides Undergraduate, Postgraduate, PG diploma courses. The courses are in the field of commerce, Management, Science, Lib. Science and Arts and it is affiliated to HNB Garhwal University, Sri Nagar, Garhwal, and Sri Dev Suman Uttarakhand University, Badshahithol, Tehri Garhwal.

Sheel Institute
Situated in Shivalik Nagar,  from Haridwar city. one of the Best Computer Institute in Haridwar.

Other colleges
There are two State Ayurvedic College & Hospital in Haridwar, one is Rishikul State Ayurvedic College (has PG level courses) and the other is Gurukul Ayurvedic College.

Other schools
 Delhi Public School, Haridwar
 Kendriya Vidyalaya, B.H.E.L. Haridwar
 DAV Central Public School, Jagjeetpur

Important areas within the city
B.H.E.L., Ranipur Township
The main factory consists of two divisions: the Heavy Electricals Equipment Plant (HEEP), and the Central Foundry Forge Plant (CFFP). Together they employ over 8000 skilled employees. The campus is divided into six sectors providing excellent residential, schooling and medical facilities.

Bahadrabad – 
Close by, in village Pathri, lies the Bhimgoda Barrage built on the Upper Ganges Canal in 1955. It also has a block development office responsible for many developed villages (e.g. Khedli, Kisanpur Rohalki, Atmalpur Bongla, Sitapur, Alipur, Salempur).

SIDCUL – 
With the arrival of big enterprises like ITC, Hindustan Unilever Limited, Dabur, Mahindra & Mahindra, Havells and Kirby, SIDCUL is set to develop into another industrial township within the city.  away from the Delhi-Hardwar National Highway, SIDCUL lies adjacent to the BHEL Township, an important Public Sector township.

Jwalapur
An old part of the city, Jwalapur is the financial and industrial capital of the city, and now an important trading and shopping centre for the locals. The town dates back to 1700 CE. This town was called Mohammed Pura and ruled by a local Muslim ruler. In the early 1600s the family of Sisodias from Mewar, descendants of Rana Pratap, fleeing from the Mughal invasion, came to settle on the outskirts of Haridwar. The families lived quietly for almost a generation to avoid detection. Local people renamed their surname to Mehta. It is firmly believed that in early 1700 the Mehtas dislodged the Muslim ruler and renamed the town as Jwalapur. This family subsequently settled in Jwalapur itself and intermarried with the local population.

Cheela Dam
A good picnic spot with a dam and a man-made lake nearby. Elephants and other wild animals may be spotted.

Shivalik Nagar
One of the newest and biggest residential areas of Haridwar. It is divided into various clusters. It was originally developed as a residential colony for BHEL employees, but with the advent of SIDCUL, population and financial activity has grown rapidly in the area due to its proximity.

Transport

Haridwar is headquarters of Haridwar district and it has good connectivity with the other towns of the district and the state.

Road
National Highway 58, between Delhi and Mana Pass passes through Haridwar connecting it with Ghaziabad, Meerut, Muzzafarnagar, Roorkee and Badrinath and National Highway 74 originating from Haridwar connects it with Kashipur, Kichha, Nagina, Pilibhit and Bareilly. Haridwar is well connected to all major cities by bus. Buses from Delhi to Haridwar are available daily, more than 150 buses are available.

Rail
The Haridwar Railway Station located in Haridwar is under the control of the Northern Railway zone of the Indian Railways. It has direct links the major cities of India such as Kolkata, Delhi, Mumbai, Thiruvananthapuram, Chennai,Gorakhpur, Muzaffarpur, Madgaon, Jaipur, Jodhpur, Ahmedabad, Patna, Gaya, Varanasi, Allahabad, Bareilly, Lucknow, Puri, and major cities of Central India namely Bhopal, Ujjain, Indore, Khandwa, Itarsi.

Air

Industry
Haridwar is rapidly developing as an important industrial township of Uttarakhand since the state government agency, SIIDCUL established in 2002, set up the Integrated Industrial Estate in a district attracting many important industrial houses which are setting up manufacturing facilities in the area. According to list of allottee provided by SIIDCUL, the industrial estate is home to over 650 companies currently.

Haridwar has an industrial area situated at the bypass road, comprising mainly ancillary units to PSU, BHEL, which was established here in 1964 and currently employs over 8000 people.

Notable people 

 Pilot Baba
 Hans Ji Maharaj
 Vijay Singh Gujjar
 Satpal Maharaj
 Prem Rawat
 Urvashi Rautela
 Charles Orman
 Ernest Burdett
 Rishabh Pant
 Narender Pal Singh
 Beatrice Harrison
 Louisa Durrell
 John Duncan Grant
 Usha Verma
 Vijay Bose
 Naresh Bedi
 Raza Ali Abidi
 Krishna Chandra Sharma
 Unwan Chishti
 Shriya Saran
 Kunwar Pranav Singh
 Ram Dayal Singh

In Art and Literature
Besides Hurdwar, a Place of Hindoo Pilgrimage referred to above, an engraving of a painting entitled  by William Purser with a poetical illustration by Letitia Elizabeth Landon was published in Fisher's Drawing Room Scrap Book, 1838.

See also

 Ahilyabai Holkar
 Dhangar
 Garhwali people
 Gurjars
 Tyagis
 Bhuiyar Dharmshala

References

Further reading
 Gateway to the Gods: Haridwar-Rishikesh. Rupinder Khullar, Reeta Khullar. 2004, UBS Publishers. .
 Hardwar Mela From the Caves and Jungles of Hindostan (1879–80), by Helena Petrovna Blavatsky (1831–1891).
 Report, by Archaeological Survey of India, Alexander Cunningham. Published by Office of the Superintendent of Government Printing, 1871. Chapt 30: Haridwar or Gangadwara, p. 231–236.
 Chapter XVII: Himalayas, Hardwar. India, Past and Present, by Charles Harcourt Ainslie Forbes-Lindsay. Published by J.C. Winston, 1903. Page 295.

External links

 

 Official website of Haridwar district.

 
Hindu holy cities
Hindu pilgrimage sites in India
Cities and towns in Haridwar district
Tourism in Uttarakhand
Shaivism
Vaishnavism
Cities in Uttarakhand